Marginella gemmula is a species of very small sea snail, a marine gastropod mollusk in the family Marginellidae, the margin snails.

Description

Shell 
The shell of Marginella gemmula, while glossy and smooth to the touch, has spires that can be anywhere from flat to moderately elevated. Most shells have various colors, but a small number can be colorless. On the outside of the shell, the columella has four plaits. The outside lip is thicker than other such creatures, and the inside of the shell sports a denticulate set of teeth and/or folds. Unlike other gastropods, Marginella gemmula's siphonal canal is not very deep, but is still present. There is no operculum present with Marginella gemmula.

Flesh 
The head of Marginella gemmula is bifurcated, with the siphon extending behind it. When moving, the foot of the animal extends past the shell.

Distribution
This species occurs in Angola at depths between 15 m and 35 m.

References

 Gofas, S.; Afonso, J.P.; Brandào, M. (Ed.). (S.a.). Conchas e Moluscos de Angola = Coquillages et Mollusques d'Angola. [Shells and molluscs of Angola]. Universidade Agostinho / Elf Aquitaine Angola: Angola. 140 pp. 
 Cossignani T. (2006). Marginellidae & Cystiscidae of the World. L'Informatore Piceno. 408pp
 Gofas S. & Fernandes F. 1994. The Marginellidae of Angola. The genus Marginella. Journal of Conchology 35(2): 103-119

External links
 
 Dautzenberg P. (1912) Mission Gruvel sur la côte occidentale d'Afrique (1909-1910): Mollusques marins. Annales de l'Institut Océanographique, Paris, (Nouvelle Série) 5(3): 1-111, pl. 1-3

Endemic fauna of Angola
gemmula
Gastropods described in 1913